"(Won't You Come Home) Bill Bailey", originally titled "Bill Bailey, Won't You Please.... Come Home?" is a popular song published in 1902. It is commonly referred to as simply "Bill Bailey".

Its words and music were written by Hughie Cannon, an American songwriter and pianist, and published by Howley, Haviland and Dresser. It is still a standard with Dixieland and traditional jazz bands. The simple 32-bar chord sequence of its chorus also underpins many other tunes played mainly by jazz bands, such as "Over the Waves", "Washington and Lee Swing", "Bourbon Street Parade", "My Little Girl", and the final themes of "Tiger Rag" and "The Beer Barrel Polka".

Origin
Cannon wrote the song in 1902 when he was working as a bar pianist at Conrad Deidrich’s Saloon in Jackson, Michigan. Willard "Bill" Bailey, also a jazz musician, was a regular customer and friend, and one night told Cannon about his marriage to Sarah (née Siegrist). Cannon "was inspired to rattle off a ditty about Bailey’s irregular hours. Bailey thought the song was a scream [i.e. very good], and he brought home a dashed-off copy of the song to show Sarah. Sarah couldn’t see the humor.... [but] accepted without comment the picture it drew of her as a wife." Cannon sold all rights to the song to a New York publisher, and died from cirrhosis aged 35. Willard and Sarah Bailey later divorced; He moved to Los Angeles with their daughter Frances, he died in 1954, and Sarah died in 1976 aged about 102. (See New York Times archives 1976, unknown date)

Popular recordings
In 1953, featured in the film Meet Me at the Fair directed by Douglas Sirk where it was sung by Jo Ann Greer who dubbed the singing voice of actress Carole Mathews.
In 1960, Bobby Darin recorded the song, where it went to #19 on the Hot 100,  and #34 on the UK charts.

Parodies
Parodist Allan Sherman recorded a parody of this song on his 1963 album My Son, the Celebrity, entitled "Won't You Come Home Disraeli?"
In the "Miss Solar System" episode of The Jetsons, first aired February 3, 1963, Jane belts out "Won't You Fly Home Bill Spacely" in Hanna-Barbera's own parody of the song. Hanna-Barbera (with Cartoon Network Studios) makes more frequent use of the song throughout its Johnny Bravo cartoon series.
In The Simpsons episode "Whacking Day", Grampa Simpson is seen posing as a female cabaret singer in Nazi Germany, singing a version of this song – with "Franz Brauder" replacing "Bill Bailey" – to Adolf Hitler.
The 1980 Smurfs album, Smurfing Sing Song, includes a version of this song entitled "Smurf Baby", in which the chorus is repeated with the name "Bill Bailey" replaced with "Smurf Baby".
Sandler & Young recorded a 20-minute medley where Bill Bailey is adapted to England, France, Switzerland, Nashville, Italian opera, Bach, Israel (with Jewish jokes), and climaxing with the United States.
The Capitol Steps performed a version referring to the 2000 Democratic Presidential Primary titled "Won't You Go Home Bill Bradley".
In P.G. Wodehouse's 1906 novel Love Among the Chickens, the narrator feeling sorry for himself blames his problems on his historical version of womanhood: "Oh woman, woman! At the bottom of everything! History is full of tragedies caused by the lethal sex. Who lost Mark Antony the world? A woman. Who let Samson in so atrociously? Woman again. Why did Bill Bailey leave home? Once more, because of a woman."
In the 1960s, there was an elementary school play called "Go Home Bill Bailey". It was a comedy about a tour guide(?) bringing tourists to the jungle.

See also
List of pre-1920 jazz standards

References

External links

 http://www.perfessorbill.com/lyrics/lybailey.htm (lyrics)
 http://scriptorium.lib.duke.edu/sheetmusic/n/n09/n0971/  (traditional arrangement from "Historic American Sheet Music")

1902 songs
1900s jazz standards
1900s song stubs
Songs written by Hughie Cannon
Al Hirt songs
Dixieland jazz standards
Songs about marriage